Pieszków may refer to the following places in Poland:
Pieszków, Lubin County in Gmina Lubin, Lubin County, Lower Silesian Voivodeship (SW Poland)
Pieszków, Lwówek Śląski County, Gmina Lwówek Śląski, Lwówek Śląski County, Lower Silesian Voivodeships (SW Poland)